Temptation of Wolves (also known as Romance of Their Own or True Romance) is a 2004 South Korean film directed by Kim Tae-kyun, and based on a novel of the same name by Internet author Guiyeoni. Starring Jo Han-sun, Gang Dong-won and Lee Chung-ah, the film is about an average high school girl who moves from the countryside to Seoul after her father's death only to become involved in a love triangle with the two most handsome and popular guys in town.

2,189,453 admissions made it the 9th highest grossing Korean film of 2004.

Synopsis 
From her appearance to her mannerisms, it is easy to tell that Jung Han-kyeong (Lee Chung-ah) is a country girl. After her father's death, she comes to Seoul to live with her mother (Kim Bo-yeon), planning to attend Kang-Shin High School. However, her life in Seoul is a series of mental and physical shocks. On the bus, a slipper is thrown randomly at her head—but her problems don't end there. The guy who threw the slipper is none other than Ban Hae-won (Jo Han-sun), the most popular guy at her school, and everywhere he steps, girls trail behind. Seeing Han-kyeong's pitiable and adorable nature, Hae-Won falls for her.

The leader of Sung-Kwon High, Kang-Shin's neighbor and rival, is named Jung Tae-sung (Gang Dong-won), and he, too, has feelings for Han-kyeong. Despite his shy, adorable face, Tae-sung has strong fists and endless obstinacy. A fight that handles both pride and love begins between the two, and neither of them is prepared to back down. But Tae-sung has a secret, one that forces him to love Han-kyeong in spite of himself, and Han-kyeong, ignorant of this, tries to do her best to be gentle with both of them. Eventually, Tae-sung leaves Han-kyeong's side, and later, Han-kyeong and Hae-won learn of his secret.

Cast 
 Jo Han-sun ... Ban Hae-won 
 Lee Chung-ah ... Jung Han-kyeong 
 Gang Dong-won ... Jung Tae-sung 
 Jung Da-hye ... Da-reum 
 Kwon Oh-min ... Han Joo-ho 
 Lee Chun-hee ... Yoo-won 
 Lee Ji-hee ... Lee Bo-jung 
 Song Chae-min ... Yoo Jae-hee 
 Kim Ha-eun ... Lee Na-yoon 
 Ahn Hyeong-jun ... Kim Dae-han 
 Do Yong-gu ... Han-kyeong's stepfather
 Jung Hye-young ... Young Han-kyeong
 Shin Tae-hoon ... Young Tae-sung
 Lee Ki-hyuk as Hae-won's member
 Chun Ho-jin ... Tae-sung's father
 Kim Bo-yeon ... Han-kyeong's mother
 Nam Jung-hee ... Han-kyeong's grandmother

Awards and nominations
2004 Blue Dragon Film Awards
 Nomination – Best New Actor – Gang Dong-won
 Nomination – Best New Actor – Jo Han-sun

2004 Korean Film Awards
 Best New Actor – Gang Dong-won

2005 Grand Bell Awards
 Best New Actress – Lee Chung-ah
 Nomination – Best New Actor – Jo Han-sun
 Nomination – Best Music - Lee Hoon-seok

References

External links 
  
 
 
 

South Korean romantic drama films
South Korean teen films
2004 films
2004 romantic drama films
Films based on South Korean novels
Films directed by Kim Tae-kyun
2000s Korean-language films
Showbox films
2000s South Korean films